is a shoot 'em-up video game developed by Now Production and published by Namco in Japan and Bandai worldwide for the Nintendo Entertainment System in 1989. It is a remixed port of the 1987 arcade game Dragon Spirit.

Gameplay

Dragon Spirit: The New Legend is a vertical shooter that plays similarly to 1942, 1943, and Tiger-Heli. The player controls a dragon who must use fireballs to destroy various enemies.

There are two different kinds of game: the golden dragon game (easy difficulty level) or the blue dragon game (normal difficulty level). A story is told between levels as the player progresses.

The "easy mode" that will become available if the player dies during the opening level offers a very different gameplay experience from the standard mode. 

Major differences in gameplay aside from the color of the dragon include differentiation in powers. The gold dragon is much faster by default, both in movement and attack speed. Additionally, power-up transformations are far more destructive and effective, often wiping out most enemies in a single strike, and sweeping across the entire screen, in some cases leaving no enemy alive.

In addition to enhanced powers and speed, many of the more difficult levels are removed from this mode, shortening the total game and story. The golden dragon also takes more damage and will face slightly different enemies and bosses. The story for Prince Lace is very different from that of King Amru's tale should the player successfully activate the standard difficulty game.

The player has 360° control within the screen on display, with most enemies appearing at the top of the screen. Hitting enemies on-screen damages (and ultimately kills) the main character. Players have two kinds of attacks; shoot directly in the air with fire or bomb the ground with bombs. There are nine worlds in the game, ranging from the Paleozoic Era to a parallel universe known only as the Evil Palace, where the final boss awaits the player in his lair.

Plot
Peace has reigned over the kingdom of Olympis for years, thanks to King Amul's (Amru in the English translation) heroic battle against the demon Zawel. After Amul married Aricia, they were blessed with the birth of their children, Princess Iris and Prince Lace. The evil Galda was building an army of evil and used his black magic to resurrect Zawel from the dead. Galda has decided to attack the Earth. Amru's son Prince Lace wakes suddenly from a nightmare, wherein his father Amru is killed when fighting Zawel, which is not how that event transpired (i.e., the player's failure to complete the first level). He is then confronted by the sorcerer Galda who declares that he is taking Lace's sister, Princess Iris, to be his prisoner. Lace takes up his father's sword to rescue his kidnapped sister from the demon Galda. Instead of transforming into a blue dragon-like his father, Lace becomes a gold dragon.

Notes

References

1989 video games
Bandai games
Fantasy video games
Namco games
Nintendo Entertainment System games
Nintendo Entertainment System-only games
Vertically scrolling shooters
Top-down video games
Video games developed in Japan
Single-player video games
Video games about dragons
Now Production games